Raiphi Vincent Gomez (born 16 October 1985) is an Indian cricketer who played for Kerala and Puducherry in domestic cricket. He is an all-rounder who bats right-handed and bowls right arm medium-fast. He was bought by Rajasthan Royals ahead of the 2009 season of Indian Premier League making him the second Kerala player to be part of an IPL franchise after Sreesanth. Raiphi has also represented India U-17 team and India U-19 team.

Gomez represented Kochi Tuskers Kerala in IPL 2011. After KTK's termination, he was selected to play for Pune Warriors India in the 5th edition of IPL.

In December 2018, he was selected for cricket association of Pondicherry as a guest player in Ranji trophy.

References

External links
 

Indian cricketers
Living people
1985 births
Kerala cricketers
Pune Warriors India cricketers
Kochi Tuskers Kerala cricketers
Cricketers from Thiruvananthapuram
Pondicherry cricketers